The episodes of children's series Pinky Dinky Doo, aired from 2005 to 2010.

Series overview

Episodes

Season 1 (2005-07)

Season 2 (2008–10)

Lists of American children's animated television series episodes